José Manuel Minjares Jiménez (born 29 May 1967) is a Mexican politician affiliated with the National Action Party. As of 2014 he served as Deputy of the LVIII and LX Legislatures of the Mexican Congress representing the Federal district.

References

1967 births
Living people
Politicians from Veracruz
Members of the Chamber of Deputies (Mexico)
National Action Party (Mexico) politicians
21st-century Mexican politicians